The 2019–20 FC Rubin Kazan season was the seventeenth successive season that Rubin Kazan played in the Russian Premier League, the highest tier of association football in Russia.

Season events
On 5 June, Kurban Berdyev left his position as manager of Rubin, with Roman Sharonov being appointed as the caretaker manager of Rubin on 6 June, but due to not possess the necessary UEFA Pro Licence at the time, but rather UEFA A Licence, he was formally registered with the league as an assistant coach, with Spanish coach Eduardo Aldama Docampo registered as the de jure head coach. On 16 December, with Rubin in 13th place in the table, Sharonov left the club by mutual consent. On 19 December, Leonid Slutsky was appointed as Rubin's new manager.

On 17 March, the Russian Premier League postponed all league fixtures until April 10th due to the COVID-19 pandemic.

On 1 April, the Russian Football Union extended the suspension of football until 31 May.

On 15 May, the Russian Football Union announced that the Russian Premier League season would resume on 21 June.

On 21 July, Rubin signed Đorđe Despotović to a 3-year contract.

Squad

On loan

Left club during season

Transfers

In

Loans in

Out

Loans out

Released

Friendlies

Competitions

Premier League

League table

Results by round

Matches

Russian Cup

Squad statistics

Appearances and goals

|-
|colspan="14"|Players away from the club on loan:

|-
|colspan="14"|Players who left Rubin Kazan during the season:

|}

Goal scorers

Clean sheets

Disciplinary record

References

External links

FC Rubin Kazan seasons
Rubin Kazan